Notylia, abbreviated Ntl in horticultural trade, is a genus of orchids. It consists of 56 recognized species, native to Mexico, Central America, Trinidad and South America.

Species currently recognized as of June 2014:

 Notylia albida  Klotzsch (1851) 
 Notylia angustifolia  Cogn. (1910)
 Notylia arachnites  Rchb.f. (1859)
 Notylia aromatica  Barker ex Lindl. (1841)
 Notylia barkeri  Lindl. (1838)
 Notylia bernoullii  Schltr. (1918)
 Notylia bisepala  S.Moore (1895)
 Notylia brenesii  Schltr. (1923)
 Notylia buchtienii  Schltr. (1912)
 Notylia bungerothii  Rchb.f. (1887)
 Notylia carnosiflora  C.Schweinf. (1946)
 Notylia durandiana  Cogn. (1904)
 Notylia ecuadorensis  Schltr. (1917)
 Notylia flexuosa  Schltr. (1925)
 Notylia fragrans  Wullschl. ex H.Focke (1853)
 Notylia glaziovii  Cogn. (1904)
 Notylia guatemalensis  S.Watson (1887)
 Notylia hemitricha  Barb.Rodr. (1881)
 Notylia incurva  Lindl. (1838)
 Notylia inversa  Barb.Rodr. (1881)
 Notylia koehleri  Schltr. (1912)
 Notylia lankesteri  Ames (1923)
 Notylia latilabia  Ames & C.Schweinf. (1925)
 Notylia laxa  Rchb.f. (1881)
 Notylia lehmanniana  Kraenzl. (1921)
 Notylia leucantha  Salazar (1999)
 Notylia longispicata  Hoehne & Schltr. (1926)
 Notylia lyrata  S.Moore (1895)
 Notylia micrantha  Lindl. (1838)
 Notylia microchila  Cogn. (1904)
 Notylia morenoi  Christenson (2001)
 Notylia nemorosa  Barb.Rodr. (1881)
 Notylia obtusa  Schltr. (1920)
 Notylia odontonotos  Rchb.f. & Warm. in H.G.Reichenbach (1881)
 Notylia orbicularis  A.Rich. & Galeotti (1845)
 Notylia panamensis  Ames (1922)
 Notylia parvilabia  C.Schweinf. (1946)
 Notylia pentachne  Rchb.f. (1854) 
 Notylia peruviana  (Schltr.) C.Schweinf. (1946)
 Notylia pittieri  Schltr. (1918)
 Notylia platyglossa  Schltr. (1914)
 Notylia pubescens  Lindl. (1842)
 Notylia punctata  (Ker Gawl.) Lindl. (1842) 
 Notylia punoensis  D.E.Benn. & Christenson (2001)
 Notylia replicata  Rchb.f. (1878)
 Notylia rhombilabia  C.Schweinf. (1946)
 Notylia rimbachii  Schltr. (1921)
 Notylia sagittifera  (Kunth) Link (1841)
 Notylia stenantha  Rchb.f. (1865)
 Notylia stenoglossa  Schltr. (1913)
 Notylia sylvestris  L.B.Sm. & S.K.Harris (1937)
 Notylia tamaulipensis  Rchb.f. (1860)
 Notylia tapirapoanensis  Hoehne (1910)
 Notylia trisepala  Lindl. & Paxton (1852) 
 Notylia venezuelana  Schltr. (1919)
 Notylia yauaperyensis  Barb.Rodr. (1891)

References

  (1825) Botanical Register, 11: sub t. 930.
  (2009). Epidendroideae (Part two). Genera Orchidacearum 5: 301 ff. Oxford University Press.

External links

 
Oncidiinae genera